is a Japanese cross country skier who competed from 1993 to 2008. Her best World Cup finish was fifth in a 4 x 5 km relay in Switzerland in 2003.

Yokoyama also competed in four Winter Olympics, earning her best finish of tenth in the 4 x 5 km relay at Salt Lake City in 2002. Her best finish at the FIS Nordic World Ski Championships was 8th in the 4 x 5 km relay at Sapporo in 2007.

References
 

1974 births
Living people
Japanese female cross-country skiers
Olympic cross-country skiers of Japan
Cross-country skiers at the 1994 Winter Olympics
Cross-country skiers at the 1998 Winter Olympics
Cross-country skiers at the 2002 Winter Olympics
Cross-country skiers at the 2006 Winter Olympics
Asian Games medalists in cross-country skiing
Cross-country skiers at the 1996 Asian Winter Games
Cross-country skiers at the 1999 Asian Winter Games
Cross-country skiers at the 2003 Asian Winter Games
Cross-country skiers at the 2007 Asian Winter Games
Asian Games gold medalists for Japan
Asian Games silver medalists for Japan
Asian Games bronze medalists for Japan
Medalists at the 1996 Asian Winter Games
Medalists at the 1999 Asian Winter Games
Medalists at the 2003 Asian Winter Games
Medalists at the 2007 Asian Winter Games
Universiade medalists in cross-country skiing
Universiade silver medalists for Japan
Competitors at the 1993 Winter Universiade
20th-century Japanese women